Oreobates quixensis, also known as the common big-headed frog, is a species of frog in the family Strabomantidae. It is found in the upper Amazon Basin in Bolivia, western Brazil, Colombia, Ecuador, and Peru. It is a very common terrestrial frog of primary and secondary tropical moist forest, also to be found in clearings, open areas and banana groves.

Description
The head is large and wider than long; the snout is short. The dorsum is pale brown to dark brown with purple tonalities and cream flecks; the skin is granular, with round keratinized granules and small, sparse, prominent, and enlarged warts.

Breeding is by direct development. Gravid females contain 15–51 eggs.

References

quixensis
Amphibians of Bolivia
Amphibians of Brazil
Amphibians of Colombia
Amphibians of Ecuador
Amphibians of Peru
Taxa named by Marcos Jiménez de la Espada
Amphibians described in 1872
Taxonomy articles created by Polbot